The 2022 National Premier Soccer League season was the 20th season of the National Premier Soccer League and part of the 110th season of FIFA-sanctioned soccer in the United States.

The regular season began on March 19 and ended on July 16. In total, 92 teams participated in this season.

Format changes
The Northwest and Southwest Conferences merged to form the Pacific Conference while the Golden Gate Conference returned to traditional league play. The Lone Star Conference returned to the South Region after temporarily joining the West in 2021.

Teams
Note: Teams that are italicized previously played in the NPSL and are returning from hiatus.

Incoming teams
Akron City FC (Akron, OH)
Apotheos FC (Kennesaw, GA)
Austin United FC (Austin, TX)
Cedar Stars FC (Chester, NY)
CF10 Houston FC (Katy, Texas)
Club Atletico Saint Louis (Saint Louis, MO)
Corinthians FC of San Antonio (San Antonio, TX)
Grove Soccer United (Richmond, VA)
Jackson Lions FC (Jackson, NJ)
Lubbock Matadors SC (Lubbock, TX)
Magia FC (Miami Gardens, FL)
Miami Beach CF (Miami Beach, FL)
Minnesota TwinStars FC (Brooklyn Park, MN)
Muskegon Risers SC (Muskegon, MI)
Oakland SC (Oakland, CA)
Pennsylvania Classics AC (Lancaster, PA)
Philadelphia Ukrainians Nationals SC (Horsham, PA)
SC Brave Lions (Glendale, CA)
Sunflower State FC (Overland Park, KS)

Name changes
Greater Lowell Rough Diamonds to Alexandria Reds

Departing teams
ASC San Diego (San Diego, CA)(merged with San Diego 1904 FC and joined the National Independent Soccer Association)
Boston City FC (Revere, MA)(joined USL League Two)
FC Baltimore Christos (Baltimore, MD)
Metro Louisville FC (Louisville, KY)(joined United Premier Soccer League)
PDX FC (Portland, OR)(joined USL League Two in 2021)
Rochester Lancers (Rochester, NY)(joined United Premier Soccer League)

Teams on hiatus or folded
Boca Raton FC (Delray Beach, FL)
Dallas City FC (McKinney, TX)
FC Golden State (Pomona, CA)
FC Indiana (Lafayette, IN)
Katy 1895 FC (Katy, TX)
Midland-Odessa Sockers FC (Midland, TX)
Port City FC (Gulfport, MS)
Spokane Shadow SC (Spokane, WA)
Storm FC (Pembroke Pines, FL)
Tacoma Stars (Waller, WA)
Temecula FC (Temecula, CA)

2022 Teams

Standings and results

West Region

Golden Gate Conference

Pacific Conference
Due to the distance between teams, the Pacific Conference was split into two divisions. The North Division featured Crossfire Redmond, International Portland Select FC and OSA Seattle FC while the South Division included FC Arizona, Las Vegas Legends FC, and SC Brave Lions. Clubs played the other teams within their division three times each and two of the teams in the other division twice each. The top two teams from each group qualified for the playoffs and play one-another in the conference semifinals.

North Division

South Division

Midwest Region

Great Lakes Conference

North Conference

Rust Belt Conference

South Region

Gulf Coast Conference

Heartland Conference

Lone Star Conference

Sunshine Conference

East Region

Keystone Conference

Mid-Atlanic Conference

North Atlantic Conference

Southeast Conference

Playoffs
Note: Games are hosted by the highest seed unless noted otherwise

West Region Conference playoffs

Golden Gate Conference playoffs

Bold = winner
* = after extra time, = penalty shootout score

Pacific Conference playoffs

Bold = winner
* = after extra time, = penalty shootout score

South Region Conference playoffs

Gulf Coast Conference playoffs

Bold = winner
* = after extra time, = penalty shootout score

Heartland Conference playoffs

Bold = winner
* = after extra time, = penalty shootout score

Lone Star Conference playoffs

Bold = winner
* = after extra time, = penalty shootout score

Sunshine Conference playoffs

Bold = winner
* = after extra time, = penalty shootout score

East Region Conference playoffs

Keystone Conference playoffs

Bold = winner
* = after extra time, = penalty shootout score

Mid-Atlantic Conference playoffs

Bold = winner
* = after extra time, = penalty shootout score

North Atlantic Conference playoffs

Bold = winner
* = after extra time, = penalty shootout score

Southeast Conference playoffs

Bold = winner
* = after extra time, = penalty shootout score

Regional and National playoffs
{{5RoundBracket-Byes
| RD1= Regional QuarterfinalsJuly 19
| RD2= Regional semifinalsJuly 16–22
| RD3= July 23–24
| RD4= July 30
| RD5= August 6
| seed-width = 2em
| team-width = 12em
| score-width = 2em

|RD1-seed03  = MW4
|RD1-team03  = Duluth FC
|RD1-score03 = 3
|RD1-seed04  = MW5
|RD1-team04  = FC Columbus
|RD1-score04 = 1

|RD1-seed07  = MW3
|RD1-team07  = Cleveland SC
|RD1-score07 = 2
|RD1-seed08  = MW6
|RD1-team08  = Pittsburgh Hotspurs
|RD1-score08 = 1

|RD2-seed01  = MW1
|RD2-team01  = Muskegon Risers
|RD2-score01 = 5
|RD2-seed02  = MW4
|RD2-team02  = Duluth FC
|RD2-score02 = 2

|RD2-seed03  = MW2
|RD2-team03  = Med City FC
|RD2-score03 = 0
|RD2-seed04  = MW3
|RD2-team04  = Cleveland SC
|RD2-score04 = 2

|RD2-seed05  = GG1
|RD2-team05  = Sacramento Gold FC
|RD2-score05 = 0
|RD2-seed06  = GG2
|RD2-team06  = El Farolito
|RD2-score06 = 3

|RD2-seed07  = PN2
|RD2-team07  = Crossfire Redmond
|RD2-score07 = 4
|RD2-seed08  = PS2
|RD2-team08  = FC Arizona|RD2-score08 = 0

|RD2-seed09  = S1
|RD2-team09  = JAX Armada U23|RD2-score09 = 3|RD2-seed10  = S4
|RD2-team10  = Naples United FC
|RD2-score10 = 1

|RD2-seed11  = S2
|RD2-team11  = Tulsa Athletic|RD2-score11 = 0(6)|RD2-seed12  = S3
|RD2-team12  = Laredo Heat SC
|RD2-score12 = 0(5)

|RD2-seed13  = E1
|RD2-team13  = FC Motown|RD2-score13 = 4|RD2-seed14  = E4
|RD2-team14  = New York Shockers
|RD2-score14 = 1

|RD2-seed15  = E2
|RD2-team15  = Alexandria Reds
|RD2-score15 = 1
|RD2-seed16  = E3
|RD2-team16  = Appalachian FC|RD2-score16 = 2|RD3-seed01  = MW1
|RD3-team01  = Muskegon Risers|RD3-score01 = 1|RD3-seed02  = MW3
|RD3-team02  = Cleveland SC
|RD3-score02 = 0

|RD3-seed03  = W1
|RD3-team03  = El Farolito
|RD3-score03 = 2(2)
|RD3-seed04  = W2
|RD3-team04  = Crossfire Redmond|RD3-score04 = 2(4)|RD3-seed05  = S1
|RD3-team05  = JAX Armada U23
|RD3-score05 = 0
|RD3-seed06  = S2
|RD3-team06  = Tulsa Athletic|RD3-score06 = 2|RD3-seed07  = E1
|RD3-team07  = FC Motown|RD3-score07 = 3|RD3-seed08  = E3
|RD3-team08  = Appalachian FC
|RD3-score08 = 0

|RD4-seed01  = 1
|RD4-team01  = Muskegon Risers
|RD4-score01 = 0
|RD4-seed02  = 4
|RD4-team02  = Crossfire Redmond|RD4-score02 = 3|RD4-seed03  = 2
|RD4-team03  = Tulsa Athletic
|RD4-score03 = 1
|RD4-seed04  = 3
|RD4-team04  = FC Motown|RD4-score04 = 2|RD5-seed01  = 4
|RD5-team01  = Crossfire Redmond
|RD5-score01 = 3
|RD5-seed02  = 3
|RD5-team02  = FC Motown|RD5-score02 = 4}}Bold = winner* = after extra time, = penalty shootout score

 2022 NPSL National Championship Championship MVP:''' Coby Handy Jean Rodriguez (MOT)

References

External links
Official National Premier Soccer League website

 
2022
2022 in American soccer leagues